The Soviet Antarctic Expedition (SAE or SovAE) (Sovetskaya antarkticheskaya ekspeditsiya) was part of the Arctic and Antarctic Research Institute of the Soviet Committee on Antarctic Research of the Academy of Sciences of the USSR.

The Soviet Union's Ministry of Sea Transport was responsible for the administration, logistics and supply of the expeditions.

The first Soviet contact with Antarctica was in January 1947 when the Slava whaling flotilla began whaling in Antarctic waters.

Stations
The first Soviet Antarctic station, Mirny, was established near the coast on February 13, 1956. This was added to in December 1957 by another station, Vostok built inland near the south geomagnetic pole.

Year-round stations
 Mirny (established February 13, 1956)
 Vostok (established December 16, 1957)
 Novolazarevskaya (established January 18, 1961)
 Molodyozhnaya (established January 14, 1963)
 Bellingshausen (established February 22, 1968)
 Leningradskaya (established February 25, 1971)
 Russkaya (established March 9, 1980)
 Progress (established April 1, 1988)

Summer stations
Komsomolskaya (established November 6, 1957)
Pionerskaya (established May 27, 1956)
Druzhnaya I (on the Filchner Ice Shelf in the Weddell Sea)
Druzhnaya II (on the Weddell Sea)

IGY stations
List of stations in use during the International Geophysical Year.
Sovetskaya
Pole of inaccessibility station

Expeditions

The Soviet Union engaged in expeditions to Antarctica from 1955 to its dissolution. After this, the Soviet Antarctic stations were taken over by Russia.

See also

 Arctic and Antarctic Research Institute
 List of Antarctic expeditions
 Soviet and Russian manned drifting ice stations
 List of Russian explorers
 Zapadnoye Lake

References

 
 Voronin, V. I. (1948) "The first Antarctic whaling expedition of the Slava flotilla" in Proceedings of the Soviet Geographical Society, 80(3):213–222

 Gan, I, Towards the great unknown: the Soviets prepare for their thrust into the Antarctic interior, National and transnational agendas in Antarctic Research from the 1950s and beyond. Proceedings of the 3rd Workshop of the SCAR Action Group on the History of Antarctic Research, BPRC Technical report no. 2011-01, Byrd Polar Research Centre, Columbus, Ohio, pp. 116–130. (2012) [Conference Edited]
 

 

 Gan, I, The Soviet Preparation for the IGY Antarctic Program and the Australian Response: Politics and Science, Boletín Antártico Chileno 2nd SCAR Workshop on the History of Antarctic Research, 22–22 September 2006, Santiago, Chile, pp. 60–70. (2009) [Non Refereed Conference Paper]   
 Gan, I, The Soviet Preparation for the IGY Antarctic Program and the Australian Response: Politics and Science, 2nd SCAR Workshop on the History of Antarctic Research, 21–22 September 2006, Santiago, Chile, pp. 11–15. (2006) [Conference Extract]   
 Gan, I, There was no cold war in Antarctica. Soviet-Australian contacts in 1950s, Russia in Antarctica Conference proceedings, April 2006, Saint Petersburg, pp. 77–78. (2006) [Conference Extract]

External links
Map of biological data from the Soviet Antarctic Expedition (1955-1958)

 
Antarctica research agencies